Kuwaiti may refer to:
 Something of, from, or related to the country of Kuwait
 A person from Kuwait, or of Kuwaiti descent, see Demographics of Kuwait 
 Kuwaiti Arabic, the dialect of Gulf Arabic spoken in Kuwait
 Kuwaiti Persian, a dialect of Persian spoken in Kuwait
 Kuwaiti cuisine
 Kuwaiti culture

See also 
 
List of Kuwaitis
 Languages of Kuwait

Language and nationality disambiguation pages